Confusion is  the state of being bewildered or unclear in one's mind about something.

Confusion or Confused may also refer to:
 Confusion and diffusion, a technical concept in cryptography

Geography 
 Confusion Bay, Newfoundland and Labrador, a bay in Canada
 Confusion Island, a subantarctic island
 Confusion Lake, a lake in Idaho, U.S.
 Confusion Range, a mountain range in Utah, U.S.
 Confusion Hill, a roadside attraction in Piercy, California, U.S.

Books
 The Confusion, a 2004 novel by Neal Stephenson
 Confusion (novella), a 1927 novella by Stefan Zweig
 Confusions, a 1974 play by Alan Ayckbourn

Music 
 Confusion (album), an album by Fela Kuti

Songs
"Confusion" (Electric Light Orchestra song)
"Confusion" (New Order song)
"Confusion" (The Zutons song)
"Confused", by SvenDeeKay
"Confused" (song), by Tevin Campbell
"Confusion", by Alice in Chains from Facelift
"Confusion", by Camouflage from Relocated
"Confusion", by Metallica from Hardwired... to Self-Destruct
"Confusion", by Miz from Say It's Forever
"Confusion", by Sparks from Big Beat
"Confusion", by Zee from Identity
"Confused", by Angel Witch from Angel Witch
"Confused!", by Kid Cudi from Speedin' Bullet 2 Heaven

Other
 ConFusion, an annual science fiction convention in Detroit, Michigan, U.S.
 Confused.com, a British insurance and financial services comparison service
 Apamea furva or confused, a species of moth
 Confusion, a season of the Discordian calendar
 "Confused" (Cow and Chicken), a television episode
 "Confusion", an episode of Code Lyoko: Evolution
 Confusion (law) or merger, in Law of obligations, is a legal figure that ends a debt when a debtor assumes the position of his former creditor in the same relationship.
 Confusion and diffusion (in cryptography)

See also 
 Circle of confusion
 Confusing similarity
 Confusion Corner, a street intersection in Winnipeg, Manitoba, Canada
 Confusion matrix
 Confusion of tongues, the fragmentation of human languages described in the Book of Genesis